The Dada Manifesto (in French, Le Manifeste DaDa) was first a short text written on July 14, 1916, by Hugo Ball and read the same day at the Waag Hall in Zürich at the first public Dada party. In this manifesto, Ball expresses his opposition to Dada becoming an artistic movement. Ball stayed active in the Dada movement for another six months, but the manifesto created conflict with his friends, notably Tristan Tzara. In 1918, Tzara wrote and published another, longer, Dada Manifesto.

References

External links 
 
 "Tristan Tzara: Dada Manifesto 1918" (text) by Charles Cramer and Kim Grant, Khan Academy
 Tristan Tzara Dada Manifesto

Dada
Manifestos
1916 documents